Fanac is a fan slang term (from fannish activities) for activities within the realm of science fiction fandom, and occasionally used in media fandom. It may be distinguished from fan labor in that "fanac" includes the publication of science fiction fanzines of the traditional kind (i.e., not primarily devoted to fan fiction), and the organization and maintenance of science fiction conventions and science fiction clubs. 

"Fanac" has also been used as a title for at least two science fiction fanzines, one published by Terry Carr and Ron Ellik, and later continued by Walter H. Breen, in the late 1950s through early 1960s; and the other published by Swedish fan  John-Henri Holmberg from 1963 to 1994.

References 

Fanspeak